Aglymbus is a genus of beetles in the family Dytiscidae, containing the following species:

 Aglymbus alutaceus (Régimbart, 1900)
 Aglymbus bimaculatus Resende & Vanin, 1991
 Aglymbus brevicornis Sharp, 1882
 Aglymbus bromeliarum Scott, 1912
 Aglymbus elongatus (H.J.Kolbe, 1883)
 Aglymbus eminens (Kirsch, 1873)
 Aglymbus fairmairei (Zimmermann, 1919)
 Aglymbus festae (Griffini, 1899)
 Aglymbus formosulus Guignot, 1956
 Aglymbus gestroi Sharp, 1882
 Aglymbus instriolatus Zimmermann, 1923
 Aglymbus janeiroi Nilsson, 2001
 Aglymbus johannis Wewalka, 1982
 Aglymbus leprieurii (Aubé, 1838)
 Aglymbus mathaei Wewalka, 1982
 Aglymbus milloti Guignot, 1959
 Aglymbus multistriatus Nilsson, 1991
 Aglymbus optatus Sharp, 1882
 Aglymbus pallidiventris (Aubé, 1838)
 Aglymbus pilatus Guignot, 1950
 Aglymbus sculpturatus Sharp, 1882
 Aglymbus strigulifer (Régimbart, 1903)
 Aglymbus subsignatus Guignot, 1952
 Aglymbus xanthogrammus (Régimbart, 1900)

References

Dytiscidae